The 1876 Glasgow and Aberdeen Universities by-election was fought on 6–10 November 1876.  The byelection was fought due to the resignation (Lords of Appeal in Ordinary) of the incumbent Conservative MP, Edward Strathearn Gordon.  It was won by the Conservative candidate William Watson.

References

1876 in Scotland
1870s elections in Scotland
1876 elections in the United Kingdom
By-elections to the Parliament of the United Kingdom in Glasgow and Aberdeen Universities
19th century in Aberdeen
1870s in Glasgow